Crassispira vexillum is a species of sea snail, a marine gastropod mollusk in the family Pseudomelatomidae.

Description
The length of the shell attains 11 mm.

The shell is closely ribbed, and with revolving ridges at the base. The color of the shell is yellowish, the lower half of the body-whorl, and a narrow lower portion of those of the spire chocolate-brown.

Distribution
This marine species occurs off Barbuda and St. Vincent

References

 Fallon P.J. (2011) Descriptions and illustrations of some new and poorly known turrids (Gastropoda: Turridae) of the tropical northwestern Atlantic. Part 3. Genus Crassispira Swainson, 1840, subgenus Crassiclava McLean, 1971. The Nautilus 125(2): 53-62

External links
 
 

vexillum
Gastropods described in 1845